Bharthari (IAST: Bhartṛhari) may refer to:

 Bhartṛhari, a Sanskrit grammarian and poet (c. 5th century CE)
 Bharthari (king), a folk hero of India
 Bharthari (film), a 1944 Hindi-language Indian film
 Bharthari, Jaunpur, a village in Uttar Pradesh, India